Zoran "Zoki" Cvijanović (born 25 January 1958) is a Serbian actor and producer. He has starred in over 70 films and television series with his most notable role coming in the drama series Sivi dom (1984-1985). He also had a memorable performance in Pretty Village, Pretty Flame as Speedy.

Selected filmography

Film

References

External links

1958 births
Living people
Male actors from Belgrade
20th-century Serbian male actors
Serbian film producers
Serbian male television actors